Anna Kolbrún Árnadóttir (born 16 April 1970 in Akureyri) is an Icelandic politician from the Centre Party who sits in the Althing.

She was one of the MPs who was part of the Klaustur Affair.

References 

Living people
1970 births
People from Akureyri
21st-century Icelandic politicians
21st-century Icelandic women politicians
Members of the Althing